Novy Aktanyshbash (Yañı Aqtanışbaş) is a rural locality (a selo) in Shushnursky Selsoviet, Krasnokamsky District, Bashkortostan, Russia. The population was 735 as of 2010. There are 9 streets.

Geography 
Novy Aktanyshbash is located 31 km south of Nikolo-Beryozovka (the district's administrative centre) by road. Novonagayevo is the nearest rural locality.

References 

Rural localities in Krasnokamsky District